Richard Yancey (born November 4, 1962) is an American author who writes works of suspense, fantasy, and science fiction aimed at young adults.

Life

Rick Yancey was born in a Miami suburb, Florida.

Yancey wrote his first short story in seventh grade while attending Crystal Lake Junior High School in Florida. After graduating from Lakeland Senior High School, he was accepted to Florida Southern College and majored in Communications. After a year at Florida Southern College, Yancey transferred to Florida State University and ultimately graduated from Roosevelt University with a B.A. in English. After graduation, Yancey planned on attending law school.

Ultimately, Yancey decided against law school and began teaching English classes as well as acting and directing in local community theatres. In 1991, Yancey applied for a government job and was hired by the Internal Revenue Service, where he worked as an agent for twelve years.

Yancey also spent 10 years of his life in Knoxville, Tennessee, where two of his books are set.

Career

While working at the IRS, Yancey wrote screenplays in his spare time. At the suggestion of his wife and collaborator, Sandy, one of his screenplays became his first professionally published book, A Burning in Homeland (Simon and Schuster), published in 2001.

With the success of A Burning in Homeland, Yancey resigned from the IRS in 2004 to concentrate on writing full-time. His memoir, Confessions of a Tax Collector (HarperCollins, 2004), chronicles his days working at the IRS.

After the release of his memoir, Yancey began work on two series of books—one for adults, and one for children.

The Alfred Kropp series tells the story of an awkward teenager who saves the world when he comes into possession of King Arthur's famed sword, Excalibur—pursued by the secret cabal of knights who have hidden it for centuries. Published by Bloomsbury Children’s Publishing in the U.S. and the U.K., and in fifteen foreign language editions, the series comprised three books: The Extraordinary Adventures of Alfred Kropp (2005), The Seal of Solomon (2007), and The Thirteenth Skull (2008).

His Highly Effective Detective books (St. Martin’s Press) are whodunits for adult readers, featuring a charming but barely competent private investigator based in Tennessee. That series consists of four titles: The Highly Effective Detective (2006), The Highly Effective Detective Goes to the Dogs (2008), The Highly Effective Detective Plays the Fool (2010), and The Highly Effective Detective Crosses the Line (2011). 
 
By 2010, Yancey had completed the first book in The Monstrumologist series. The tetralogy tells the tale of a 19th-century doctor and his young apprentice, who race around the world chasing—and being chased by—monsters. This highly acclaimed series, published by Simon and Schuster Children’s Books in the U.S. and the U.K, and in eight foreign language editions, comprised four books: The Monstrumologist (2009), The Curse of the Wendigo (2010), The Isle of Blood (2011), and The Final Descent (2013).

Bibliography

Novels

The Highly Effective Detective series:
 The Highly Effective Detective (2006)
 The Highly Effective Detective Goes to the Dogs (2008)
 The Highly Effective Detective Plays the Fool (2010)
 The Highly Effective Detective Crosses the Line (2011)

Standalone:
 A Burning in Homeland (2003)

Young adult novels

Alfred Kropp series:
 The Extraordinary Adventures of Alfred Kropp (2005)
 Alfred Kropp: The Seal of Solomon (2007)
 Alfred Kropp: The Thirteenth Skull (2008)
 The Alfred Kropp Files: The Unauthorized Notes from the Author (2009), short stories

The Monstrumologist series:
 The Monstrumologist (2009)
 The Curse of the Wendigo (2010)
 The Isle of Blood (2011)
 The Final Descent (2013)

The 5th Wave series:
 The 5th Wave (2013)
 The Infinite Sea (2014)
 The Last Star (2016)

Children's books

 Empire Rising (2009)

Non-fiction

 Confessions of a Tax Collector: One Man's Tour of Duty Inside the IRS (2004), memoirs

Adaptations

 The 5th Wave (2016), film directed by J Blakeson, based on novel The 5th Wave

References

External links 
 
 
 
 
 William James Henry (pseudonym) at LC Authorities, 1 record
 Rick Yancey's Official Wattpad Profile

Living people
21st-century American novelists
Writers from Miami
Writers of young adult science fiction
1962 births
Michael L. Printz Award winners
American young adult novelists
21st-century American memoirists
American fantasy writers
American science fiction writers
American male novelists
21st-century American male writers
Novelists from Florida
American male non-fiction writers